Los K-Becillas ("The Bosses" in English) is a 2005 album by Master Joe & O.G. Black. It is the last album that Master Joe and OG Black work on because they broke up. It is the most successful album to date and peaked at 17 in Top Latin Albums and 37 in Top Heatseekers. Los K-Becillas was nominated for a Lo Nuestro Award for Urban Album of the Year.

Track listing
 D' Abuso 
 Mil Amores
 Actúa (feat. Lennox, Newtone)
 ¿Dónde Te Gusta? (feat. Speedy)
 Los Bravos (feat. Don Chezina)  diss to Don Omar
 Déjala Que Caiga (feat. Yomo)
 La Hija de Tuta
 Fantasía (feat. Lil' Sean)
 Matadora (feat. O'Neill)
 Acribíllala (feat. Denual)
 Por Donde Les Duele diss to Hector El Father
 Gata Psycho (feat. Yaviell)
 La Malta 
 Mil Amores [Bachata Version] 
 Banshee Robao (feat. Yerai y Warionex)

References

Master Joe & O.G. Black albums
2005 albums
Albums produced by Rafy Mercenario